Shahid Iqbal (born 9 April 1974) is a former Pakistani cricketer who played first-class cricket for Karachi and Hyderabad teams between 1995 and 2004.

In 1998/99 he shared the world record List A 8th wicket partnership with a 203-run stand with Haaris Ayaz. He also holds the record first-class bowling figures for Karachi Port Trust, having taken 7 for 19 in 2003/04.

References

External links 

1974 births
Living people
Pakistani cricketers
Karachi Port Trust cricketers
Karachi Whites cricketers
Karachi Blues cricketers
Cricketers from Karachi
Hyderabad (Pakistan) cricketers